The following lists events that happened during 1928 in Chile.

Incumbents
President of Chile: Carlos Ibáñez del Campo

Events

December
1 December – 1928 Talca earthquake

Births 
2 February – Raimundo Infante (d. 1986)
28 April – Manuel Muñoz (footballer)
15 May – Ian Campbell (rugby player)
2 October – Carlos Rojas
19 December – Andrés Prieto
23 December – Hernán García de Gonzalo, retired Chilean diplomat and academic

Deaths
14 April – Abdón Cifuentes (b. 1835)

References 

 
Years of the 20th century in Chile
Chile